Vers les icebergs [Essai sur Henri Michaux] is an essay by J. M. G. Le Clézio on Henri Michaux.

Vers les icebergs could well be translated into English as To the Icebergs (Essay on Henri Michaux) according to France.com.

Henri Michaux
Henri Michaux was a highly idiosyncratic Belgian poet writer and painter who wrote in the French language. Michaux is best known for his esoteric books written in a highly accessible style, and his body of work includes poetry travelogues, and art criticism. Michaux travelled widely, tried his hand at several careers, and experimented with drugs, the latter resulting in two of his most intriguing works, Miserable Miracle and The Major Ordeals of the Mind and the Countless Minor Ones. Vers les icebergs is an essay on the author of
Misérable miracle; it was translated by Louise Varèse into English with the title Miserable Miracle: Mescaline
and
 Les Grandes Épreuves de l'esprit et les innombrables petites; it was translated by Richard Howard as The Major Ordeals of the Mind and the Countless Minor Ones

Publication history
, first French edition

References

1985 essays
Essays by J. M. G. Le Clézio